The women's cycling sprint at the 2012 Olympic Games in London took place at the London Velopark from 5 to 7 August. Anna Meares from Australia won the gold medal and Victoria Pendleton of Great Britain took silver. China's Guo Shuang won the bronze.

Competition format

The sprint event was a single-elimination tournament after seeding via time trial. Each match pits two cyclists against each other in the best-of-three races. Each race consisted of three laps of the track with side-by-side starts.

Schedule 
All times are British Summer Time

Results

Qualification

First round

Match 1

Match 3

Match 5

Match 7

Match 9

Match 2

Match 4

Match 6

Match 8

First round repechage

Match 1

Match 2

Match 3

Second round

Match 1

Match 3

Match 5

Match 2

Match 4

Match 6

Second round repechage

Match 1

Match 2

9th–12th place classifications

Quarter-finals

Match 1

Match 3

Match 2

Match 4

5th–8th place classifications

Semi-finals

Match 1

Match 2

Finals
Bronze medal match

Gold medal match

References

Cycling at the Summer Olympics – Women's sprint
Track cycling at the 2012 Summer Olympics
Olymp
Women's events at the 2012 Summer Olympics